Hearing protector fit-testing, also known as field attenuation estimation system (FAES), measures the degree of noise attenuation when using the hearing protection device by a particular worker in the enterprise. Such measurements are necessary because noise attenuation is very variable among workers, and it can be close to zero for a significant proportion of them. Individual anatomical differences and varying ability to correctly apply HPD do not allow predicting noise attenuation in workers based on laboratory measurements with satisfactory accuracy. This is typically carried out using one of the available fit-testing hardware and software systems. The effectiveness is typically measured as a personal attenuation rating (PAR) which is subtracted from the known noise exposure to estimate the total noise exposure a single person has when wearing the tested hearing protection device (HPD). The Occupational Safety and Health Administration, National Hearing Conservation Association and National Institute for Occupational Safety and Health recommend it for all workers used HPD as a best practice, and describes existing testing methods and how to incorporate them in hearing conservation programs.

Hearing protection devices such as earplugs or earmuffs must be worn correctly for the wearer to be protected from noise. Correct use of hearing protection includes:

 Choosing the most appropriate hearing protection device, both with appropriate level of attenuation and appropriate fit for the individual.  Ideally, the device should limit the sound intensity that reaches the ear to levels below 85 dBA.  If the attenuation does not limit the noise levels to that level, other alternatives should be sought.  If the attenuation is greater than that, it can also interfere with the HPD use.
 Wearing or inserting the hearing protection device correctly so it seals the wearer's ear canal, using the "roll-pull-hold" method for foam earplugs, and ensuring earmuffs create an unbroken seal around each ear.

Fit-testing hearing protection can facilitate an appropriate choice of hearing protection, and allow for the professional administering the fit-test to train users on proper techniques for wear.

Alberta Government changed the requirements of the laws. Employers are required to fit test HPD of each employee from March 31, 2023. A similar trend has emerged in the European Union.

Personal attenuation rating (PAR) 
Similar to a noise reduction rating (NRR) required on hearing protection devices in the United States, a personal attenuation rating (PAR) is obtained from an attenuation measurement at one or more than one frequency. However, the PAR is regarded as more accurate than the NRR because it is calculated per individual and per hearing protection device, while NRR is a generalized estimate of potential sound reduction based on the protection provided to a small population of people.  It gives the evaluator an estimate of the total noise exposure an individual is receiving when wearing hearing protection.

Fit-testing methods 
Although all fit-testing systems assess hearing protection devices to give a resulting personal attenuation rating, there are a few different types of technology that have been developed, with real-ear attenuation at threshold (REAT) as the established standard under ANSI/ASA S12.6. It is important to note that the outcome measure generated by each system varies from a simple pass/fail to a quantitative personal attenuation rating (PAR) and can be interpreted differently to determine the effectiveness of hearing protection or calculate total noise exposure.

The different methods used to measure the attenuation provided by HPDs are as follows:

Real-ear attenuation at threshold (REAT) 
REAT is the most commonly used type of fit-testing technology used in commercial systems, and is considered the "gold standard" for fit-testing. REAT technology measures the difference in auditory (hearing) thresholds without hearing protection (unoccluded) and with hearing protection (occluded). Most REAT systems use a subjective measure to determine auditory thresholds much like a hearing test where the subject indicates when sound is heard at various frequencies. For earmuffs this must be tested in an acoustic chamber, however for earplugs, headphones can be used, making the test easier for commercial use. For noncritical screening, REAT can be performed using a web browser and standard audio devices.

Microphone-in-real-ear (MIRE) 
 Also referred to as F-MIRE (field microphone in real ear). This method measures attenuation by placing a small microphone inside the ear canal while hearing protection is worn. Sound pressure levels (SPL) are measured inside and outside of the ear simultaneously and used to calculate a PAR.

Loudness balance 
This method first has the subject listen to tones with headphones and "match" loudness between both ears until tones sound equally loud on both sides. Then an earplug is placed in one ear while the baseline procedure is repeated to match loudness in both ears, then the procedure is repeated a third time so both ears are tested individually with earplugs. This calculates a personal attenuation rating based on the loudness of the sound delivered to the unprotected ear when it matches the protected ear.

Use of Fit-testing as a training tool 
There has been evidence that including fit-testing as a part of employee training for correct hearing protection device use increases user ability for proper insertion on follow-up.

See also 
 Noise health effects
 Hearing conservation programs
Hearing protection device
Earplug
Earmuffs
Safe-in-Sound Award

References

External links 
 OSHA's Letter of interpretation on hearing protection fit-testing

Occupational safety and health
Hearing loss
Audiology
Acoustics